The 1986 FIFA World Cup qualification UEFA Group 6 was a UEFA qualifying group for the 1986 FIFA World Cup. The group comprised Denmark, Norway, Republic of Ireland, Soviet Union and Switzerland.

The group was won by Denmark with the Soviet Union as the runners up. Both teams qualified for the 1986 FIFA World Cup.

Standings

Results

Goalscorers

8 goals

 Preben Elkjær

5 goals

 Oleh Protasov

4 goals

 Michael Laudrup

3 goals

 Georgi Kondratiev

2 goals

 Klaus Berggreen
 Søren Lerby
 Frank Stapleton
 Tom Sundby
 André Egli

1 goal

 John Sivebæk
 Tony Grealish
 Kevin Sheedy
 Mickey Walsh
 Pål Jacobsen
 Hallvar Thoresen
 Fyodor Cherenkov
 Anatoliy Demyanenko
 Yuri Gavrilov
 Sergey Gotsmanov
 Hennadiy Lytovchenko
 Umberto Barberis
 Jean-Paul Brigger
 Christian Matthey

External links
Fifa.com page
Rsssf page
Results and Scorers

6
1984–85 in Republic of Ireland association football
1985–86 in Republic of Ireland association football
1984–85 in Swiss football
1985–86 in Swiss football
1984 in Danish football
1985 in Danish football
1984 in Soviet football
1985 in Soviet football
1984 in Norwegian football
1985 in Norwegian football
Qual